Bonnierella may refer to:
Bonnierella (crustacean), a genus of crustaceans in the family Ischyroceridae
Polyscias, for which Bonnierella is a synonym